Prosopocera albovestita is a species of beetle in the family Cerambycidae. It was described by Stephan von Breuning in 1936. It is known from the Democratic Republic of the Congo.

References

Prosopocerini
Beetles described in 1936
Endemic fauna of the Democratic Republic of the Congo